The 1994 Greece Tournament was a summer international football friendly tournament held in Greece, between 9 and 13 May 1994.
Besides the host nation Greece, Cameroon , and Bolivia participated in the tournament.

This mini-tournament was arranged as part of Greece's build-up to the 1994 FIFA World Cup, which was the first time they had made it to the FIFA World Cup finals.

Results

Table

Statistics

Goalscorers

See also
 Tournoi de France
 Hassan II Trophy

References

External links 
 Greece Tournament 1994

1993–94 in Greek football
1994 in Bolivian football
International association football competitions hosted by Greece